Sarah Cole (1805–1857) was an American landscape painter and the sister of prominent American landscape painter Thomas Cole. Many of Cole's paintings are similar in subject and visuals to her brother's. Though she was one of the earliest female landscape painters working in the United States, little is known of her life, and very few of her works have survived or can be located today.

Early life 
Though Cole spent most of her life in America, she was born in Lancashire, England. Her parents, James and Mary Cole, had six other children aside from her and Thomas, all daughters. Thomas was the seventh of the eight children, and Sarah was the youngest. In 1818, her parents immigrated to the United States with four of their children, the sisters Ann, Mary, and Sarah, their brother Thomas, and an aunt. The family arrived in Philadelphia in July, and moved to Steubenville, Ohio, in September of the same year, except for Thomas, who remained in Philadelphia for a year before joining the family in Steubenville. In Steubenville, Ann and Mary opened a seminary where Sarah may have also eventually taught.

In 1824, the family moved to Pittsburgh. The next year, they moved to New York City, where Sarah likely lived for the rest of her life, often visiting Catskill where she would join Thomas on hikes in the Catskill Mountains. Sarah also occasionally visited family and friends in Baltimore.

Career and paintings 
It is not known when Sarah Cole began to make art, though she first mentions that she is painting in letters to her brother in the mid 1830s. She exhibited her paintings publicly only after the death of Thomas in February 1848, most likely to help support herself financially. The National Academy of Design in New York City displayed her work from 1848 to 1852, and her works also appeared in the American Art-Union and the Maryland Historical Society during her lifetime. Titles of these canvases indicate original, rather than copied, subjects. The majority of her exhibited paintings are now lost.

Two of Sarah Cole's paintings that can be found today are on display in the Albany Institute of History and Art in Albany, New York. The paintings are A View of the Catskill Mountain House, a scene of the titular white house on a hill covered with fall foliage and a small seated figure on the ground looking up at it, and Mount Aetna, a view of the mountain in the background with a landscape and people praying to a shrine of an icon. A note on the back of the canvas of the Catskill Mountain House painting indicates that it was copied from a painting by Thomas Cole.  A View of the Catskill Mountain House is nearly identical to her brother's painting of the same subject.  Mount Aetna is not a direct copy but it is likewise similar to her brother's style.

Another painting by Sarah Cole, Ancient Column Near Syracuse (1848), depicts a landscape with a Neoclassical theme. It pictures a person with some animals on a green field in front of ancient ruins. The Thomas Cole National Historic Site in the Catskills also houses her paintings Duffield Church, English Landscape, and Landscape with Church.

In addition to being a painter, Sarah made etchings. She was trained in etching by the painter and engraver Asher B. Durand. None of her etchings survive today but in 1888, decades after her death, New York's Union League Club held an exhibition called “Women Etchers of America” that included some of her work. All of the other exhibitors in that show were living artists.

Sarah Cole died in 1857, spending her final days in Catskill, New York.

References 

1805 births
1857 deaths
American landscape painters
19th-century American painters
People from Lancashire (before 1974)
British emigrants to the United States
19th-century American women artists
American women painters
Artists from Lancashire